Prince Blessed (foaled 1957 in Kentucky) was an American Thoroughbred racehorse who, at $77,000, was the highest priced yearling auctioned in 1958. He is best known for winning the 1961 Hollywood Gold Cup as well as for siring Ole Bob Bowers who in turn sired the two-time American Horse of the Year and U.S. Racing Hall of Fame inductee, John Henry.

References

External links
 Prince Blessed's pedigree and partial racing stats

1957 racehorse births
Racehorses bred in Kentucky
Racehorses trained in the United States
Thoroughbred family 21-a